Delhi is an ancient centre of Jainism, home to over 165 Jain temples. Delhi has a large population of Jains spread all over the city. It has had continued presence of a Jain community throughout its history, and it is still a major Jain centre.

Rajput period
In Delhi, during the Tomara dynasty, the Jain poet Vibudh Shridhar wrote the Apabhramsa work Pasanah Chariu "The Conduct of Parshva" in VS 1189 with the support of a Jain merchant prince, Nattal Sahu. This book provides the very first account of the city of Delhi and the first mention of the Agrawal community. Agrawals continue to be the major business community in and around Delhi. Vibudh Shridhar is the first known Agrawal author. His Pasanah Chariu provides the first reference to the Agrawal community and the first historical reference to the legend of the origin of the name Dilli for Delhi.

हरियाणए देसे असंखगाम, गामियण जणि अणवरथ काम|परचक्क विहट्टणु सिरिसंघट्टणु, जो सुरव इणा परिगणियं|
रिउ रुहिरावट्टणु बिउलु पवट्टणु, ढिल्ली नामेण जि भणियं|Hariyāṇaē dēsē asaṅkhagāma, gāmiyaṇa jaṇi aṇavaratha kāma. Paracakka vihaṭṭaṇu sirisaṅghaṭṭaṇu, jō surava iṇā parigaṇiyaṁ. Riu ruhirāvaṭṭaṇu biulu pavaṭṭaṇu, ḍhillī nāmēṇa ji bhaṇiyaṁ|There are countless villages in Haryana country. The villagers there work hard. They don't accept domination of others, and are experts in making the blood of their enemies flow. Indra himself praises this country. The capital of this country is ḍhillī.
जहिं असिवर तोडिय रिउ कवालु, णरणाहु पसिद्धउ अणंगवालु || वलभर कम्पाविउ णायरायु, माणिणियण मणसंजनीय ||Jahiṁ asivara tōḍiya riu kavālu, ṇaraṇāhu pasiddha'u aṇaṅgavālu || valabhara kampāviu ṇāyarāyu, māṇiṇiyaṇa maṇasan̄janīya."The ruler Anangapala is famous, he can slay his enemies with his sword. The weight caused the Nagaraja to shake."
Manidhari Jinchandra Suri visited Delhi (then often called Yoginipur) during the rule of the Tomara king Madanpal. He died in Samvat 1223. His samadhi is now known as the Mehrauli Dada Bari.

Khalji period

Alauddin Khalji recruited Thakkar Pheru a Shrimal Jain from Kannana in Haryana as a treasurer. He was an expert in coins, metals, and gems. For the benefit of his son Hemapal, he wrote several books on related subjects including Dravya Prariksha on metals and various coins; and Ratna Pariksha on various precious gems stones. He was continuously employed until the rule of Ghiasuddin Tughluq.

Tughlaq period
Delhi was the location where the Digambara Bhattaraka institution was initiated according to some authors. Bhaṭṭāraka Prabhachandra, who was the disciple of Bhaṭṭāraka Ratnakirti of Ajmer, visited Delhi at the invitation of the lay Jains there. He visited the Muslim ruler Firuz Shah Tughluq, who had a Jain minister named Chand Shah. At Ferozshah's request, he visited his inner courtyard. Until that time, Prabhachandra used to be without clothes, but at Chand Sah's request, he wore a loincloth. Bakhtavar Shah in his Buddhi Prakash writes:

दिल्लि के पातिसाहि भये पेरोजसाहि जब,
चान्दौ साह प्रधान भट्टारक प्रभाचन्द्र तब, 
आये दिल्ली मांझि वात जीते विद्यावर,  
साहि रीझि कै करै दरसन अन्तहपुर,
तिह समै लिंगोट लिवाय पुनि चांद विनती उच्चरी
मानि हैं जती जुत वस्त्र हम श्रावक सौगन्द करी ||616||

However, Paramanad Shasti has suggested that Prabhachandra must have visited earlier, during the time of b. Tughluq.  Prabhachandra's disciples Dhanapal and Bramha Nathuram has described his visit to Delhi. Bahubali Charit states that in a great festival Ratnakirti anointed Prabhachandra. Muhammad had the pleasure of listening to Prabhachandra, who had defeated other scholars in disputations:

तहिं भव्यहिं सुमहोच्छव विहियउ, सिरिरयणकित्ति पट्टेणिहियउ |
महमंद साहिमणुरंजिउ,विज्जहिवाइयमणुभंजिउ ||

Prabhachandra was thus the first Bhattaraka of Delhi in 1385 CE when the Prashati of the Bhattrakas of Shravanabelagola is recited, other Bhattaraka seats are mentioned, the first among them being Yoginipur (Delhi).

All the Bhattarakas of North India belonging to the Balatkara Gana of Mula Sangh belong to the lineage established by Bhaṭṭāraka Padmanadi, the successor of Prabhācandra.

The Bhaṭṭāraka tradition in Delhi survived until the British rule, and the Shri Parsvanath Jain Mandir temple in Subji mandi is still known as the Bhaṭṭāraka Temple.

Jinaprabh Suri and Vividha Tirtha Kalpa
Jinaprabh Suri, who had wandered over a large part of India and written an account of various tirthas during Samvat 1364–1389, lived in Delhi during the rule of b. Tughluq and wrote parts of the Vividha Tirtha Kalpa there. A Jain idol originally at Hansi which was in the royal storage, was released with his efforts. It is now said to be located at the Jain temple at Chelpuri in Delhi.

Mughal period

Both Akbar and Jahangir, who had their capital at Agra, invited and met Jain monks. Shahjahan moved his capital to Delhi after building the walled city of Delhi called Shahjahanabad.

Several Jain, such as Sahu Todar served as the imperial treasurers during the Mughal rule.

A part of Shahjahanabad was allocated to the Jains on the south side of the Chandni Chowk canal, close to the imperial residence (qila-mubarak, now known as the Red Fort). The Jains were permitted to have a temple during 1658 in Urdu Bazar, which was called the Urdu Mandir (now Lal Mandir), provided it did not look like a temple.

Raja Harsukh Rai in the early 19th century was the chief of the Agrawal Jain community, and a builder of several Jain temples in and around Delhi including the Naya Mandir, was the imperial treasurer during Sam. 1852-Sam. 1880. Naya Mandir was the first Delhi temple to have a shikhara.

Modern period

Delhi has 148 Digambara temples, mostly in the walled city areas, 61 Sthanakvasi Upashrayas and 16 Svetambara Murtipujak temples. In modern Delhi, the majority of Jains in Jain Colony (Veer Nagar), nearby Roopnagar area are Bhabra refugees from Punjab in Pakistan who arrived after the partition of India.

Main temples 

 Digambara Jain  Lal Mandir
The oldest  Jain temple in Delhi known as Lal Mandir ("Red Temple"). It is just opposite of the Red Fort on the Netaji Subhas Marg, Chandni Chowk, Delhi. Constructed in 1658, the temple has undergone many modifications, additions, and alterations. The temple has a free bird hospital (though donations are appreciated) in the courtyard. It practices the Jain principle that all life is sacred.

 Shri Atma Vallabh Jain Smarak
Located at 20th kilometer on G. T. Karnal Road, its idyllic setting bring out the elegance of the buildings, which were all built according to traditional Jain Shastras. The complex includes Shri Vasupujaya Temple, Shri Vallabh Smarak, a Shastra Bhandar, a Jain Museum, and a Research Centre for Indology.  The complex also has a school for children, a Dharamshala & Bhojanalaya for the convenience of visitors, as well as a free dispensary. The complex also contains "Devi Padamavati Temple" and a shrine of Sadhvi Mrigavati ji.

 Naya Mandir 
This was the first temple in Delhi with a shikhar. Raja Harsukh Rai, imperial treasurer in the late Mughal period, constructed this large and ornate Jain temple in the Dharampura locality of Old Delhi in 1807 during the rule of Mughal Emperor Akbar II with a cost of about 8 Lakh rupees, then an enormous amount. He was able to obtain the royal permission to construct a shikhara for the temple for the first time during the Mughal rule. This temple is known as the Naya Mandir (new temple), since an older Jain temple, now known as the Lal Mandir already existed.

 Ahinsa Sthal 
Ahinsa Sthal is a Jain temple located in Mehrauli, Delhi. A magnificent monolithic  statue of Tirthankara Mahāvīra in lotus position weighing around 30 tonnes is installed here. The temple complex also consist of a large garden.

 Dādābadī, Mehrauli 
The dādābadī in Delhi, is the place where Dādā Guru Jinachandra Sūri was cremated. According to the legend, while on his deathbed, he told his followers that when he died the "Mani" (magic jewel) embedded in his forehead would fall out and should be placed in a bowl of milk. He also instructed them that his body should not be kept anywhere while preparing for the funeral. Everyone was so sad, however, that they forgot his instructions and set his body on the ground. When they tried to move it again, it wouldn't budge. Even elephants were used, but all attempts failed and the last rites had to be performed right there, at the spot where the shrine now stands.

Nearby Jain Tirthas 
 Hastinapur
 Tijara
 Ahi Kshetra
 Hansi
 Ranila
 Kasan

Other Temples

Central Delhi
 Shri Aggarwal Digambar Jain Mandir, Jaisinghpura, near Shivaji stadium N Delhi-110 001
 Shri Khandelwal Digambar Jain Mandir, Conghaut place, near Shivaji stadium N Delhi- 01
 Shri Digambar Jain Chetalya, Gali khazanchimal, Dariba kalan Delhi-110 006
 Shri Digambar Jain Chetalya, Vedwada Delhi-110 006
 Shri Digambar Jain Chetalya, Satghera, Dharampura Delhi-110 006
 Shri Digambar Jain Meruji Mandir,  Dharampura Delhi-110 006
 Shri Digambar Jain Panchayati Mandir,  Dharampura Delhi-110 006
 Shri Digambar Jain Chetalya, Gali kuanwali, Gali Anar, Dharampura Delhi-110 006
 Shri Digambar Jain Padhmawati purwal Mandir, Dharampura Delhi-110 006
 Shri Digambar Jain Godha Mandir, Vedwada Delhi-110 006
 Shri Digambar Jain Bada Mandir, Kucha Seth, Dariba kalan Delhi-110 006
 Shri Digambar Jain Mandir, SatGhera Dharampura Delhi-110 006
 Shri Digambar Jain Bada Mandir, Dharampura Delhi-110 006
 Shri Digambar Jain Chetalya, Deputy Mal Ji Jain, Dharampura Delhi-110 006
 Shri Digambar Jain Mandir, 281, Delhi Gate Delhi-110 002
 Shri Digambar Jain Ahinsa Mandir, 1, Ansari Road, DaryaGunj N.Delhi-110 002 
 Shri Digambar Jain Mandir, JainBal Ashram, DaryaGunj N.Delhi-110 002
 Shri Digambar Jain Mandir, Mandirwali Gali, PahariDhiraj Delhi-110 006
 Shri Digambar Jain Mandir, Mantola, Pahadganj N.Delhi-110 055
 Shri Digambar Jain Mandir, Chappaewala Kuan, Karol Bagh N.Delhi-110 005
 Shri Digambar Jain Mandir, C-5/29, New Rohtak Road, Karolbagh N.Delhi-110 005
 Shri Digambar Jain Mandir, Ahimsa Bhawan, Shankar Road N.Delhi-110 005
 Shri Digambar Jain Mandir, 21, Rajpura Road N.Delhi-110 054
 Shri Digambar Jain chota Mandir, Kucha Seth, Dariba Kalan Delhi-110 006
 Shri Digambar Jain Mandir, 608, Kucha Pati Ram, Sita Ram Bazar Delhi-110 006
 Shri Digambar Jain Mandir, D.J Mahila Asharam, Daryaganj Delhi-110 002
 Shri Digambar Jain Chetalya, (Hukam Chand Ji) 7/33, DaryaGanj Delhi-110 002
 Shri Digambar Jain Mandir, Deupty Ganj Delhi-110 002
 Shri Digambar Jain Mandir, Gali Nayan Si ngh, Pahari Dhiraj Delhi-110 006
 Shri Digambar Jain Mandir, New Colony, Model Basti N.Delhi-110 005
 Shri Digambar Jain Mandir, Dev Nagar, Karol Bagh N.Delhi-110 005
 Shri Digambar Jain Mandir, Ram Bazar, Mori Gate Delhi-110 006
 Shri Digambar Jain Shanti Nath Chetalya, Vedwada Delhi-110 006
 
East Delhi Area
 Shri Digambar Jain Mandir, 60 ft wide Rd, Balbir Nagar, Sahadra Delhi 110 032
 Shri Digambar Jain Mandir, Gali No.8, Ulanghanpur,Naveen Sahadra Delhi 110 032
 Shri Digambar Jain Mandir, Shanti Bldg, Mandola Rd, RamNagar, Sahadra Delhi 110 032
 Shri Digambar Jain Mandir, Gali-10, Brahampuri,New Seelampur, Delhi 110 053
 Shri AdiNath Digambar Jain Mandir, Gotampuri, Near Seelampur, Sahadra Delhi 110 053
 Shri Digambar Jain Mandir, Kaithwada, Near Pushta, Sahadra Delhi 110 053
 Shri Digambar Jain Mandir, 100 Ft Rd, Gali no 8, Jyoti Colony, Sahadra Delhi 110 032
 Shri Digambar Jain Mandir, Govind Vihar, Karawal Nagar, Delhi 110 092
 Shri Digambar Jain Mandir, Mouzpur, Ghonda,Near Veg Market Chowk, Delhi110 092
 Shri Digambar Jain Mandir, R Block, Dilshad Garden, G T Road, Sahadra,  Delhi 110 032
 Shri Digambar Jain Mandir, Jain Gali, Gandhi Nagar, Delhi 110 031
 Shri Digambar Jain Mandir, Raghuwarpura-II, Gali No-6, Delhi 110 031
 Shri Digambar Jain Mandir, Kabool Nagar, Near Petrol Pump, Sahadra,  Delhi 110 032
 Shri 1008 Parshvanath Digambar Jain Mandir, Yamuna Vihar, Block C-6, Radhika Marg, Delhi 110 053
 Shri Parshva Nath Digambar Jain Mandir, Ganga Vihar, Delhi 110 094
 Shri Shanti Nath Digambar Jain Mandir, Sadatpur, Karawela Nagar, Delhi 110 094
 Shri Mahavir Digambar Jain Mandir, 30/8, Gali No-10, Vishwas Nagar, Delhi 110 032
 Shri Digambar Jain Mandir, Gali No-7, Bhajanpura, Delhi 110 053
 Shri Digambar Jain Mandir, Jain Nagar, New Usman Nagar, Sahadra, Delhi 110 053
 Shri digambar Jain mandir shastri park pin 110053, Yamuna Pushta, Sahadra, Delhi
 Shri Digambar Jain Mandir, Shivaji Park, Sahadra, Delhi 110 032
 Shri Digambar Jain Mandir, Gali No-2, Kailash Nagar, Delhi 110 031
 Shri Parshva Nath Digambar Jain Mandir, Gali No-12, Kailash Nagar, Delhi 110 031
 Shri Digambar Jain Mandir, Dharampura, Gandhi Nagar,  Delhi 110 031
 Shri Digambar Jain Mandir, F-5/97, Krishna Nagar, (Near Bus stand), Delhi 110 051
 Shri Digambar Jain Mandir, Bholanath Nagar, Near Babu Ram School, Sahadra, Delhi-32
 Shri AdiNath Digambar Jain Mandir, Block-B,Vivak Vihar, Delhi 110 032
 Shri Digambar Jain Mandir, Ram Gali, Vishvas Nagar, Sahadra, Delhi 110 032
 Shri Shanti Nath Digambar Jain Mandir, Gali No-B, Shanti Maholla, Gandhi Nagar,Delhi-31
 Shri Digambar Jain Mandir, Bank Enclave, Near Laxshmi Ngr, Delhi 110 092
 Shri Digambar Jain Mandir, 71, Patpar Ganj, Delhi 110 091
 Shri Digambar Jain Mandir, S-9B, Shakurpur, Delhi 110 092
 Shri Digambar Jain Mandir, Bahubali Enclave, Delhi 110 092
 Shri Digambar Jain Mandir, F- Block, Jawahar Park, Laxshmi Nagar Delhi 110 092
 Shri Digambar Jain Mandir, Rishabh Nagar, Delhi 110 092
 Shri Digambar Jain Mandir, 10- Bihari Colony, Sahadra Delhi 110 032
 Shri Digambar Jain Mandir, Jain Gali, Chota Bazaar, Sahadra, Delhi 110 032
 Shri Digambar Jain Mandir, Shiv Puri, Sahadra, Delhi 110 032
 Shri Digambar Jain Mandir, Shankar Ngr-Ex, Gali No-6, Raghwarpura Road, Delhi 110 051
 Shri Parshva Nath Digambar Jain Mandir, 105, New Lahore Shashtri Ngr, Delhi 110 031
 Shri Digambar Jain Mandir, V-33A, Shakurpur, Delhi 110 092
 Shri Digambar Jain Mandir, C-245, Pandav Nagar, Delhi 110 092
 Shri Digambar Jain Mandir, Block-F, Preet Vihar, Delhi 110 092
 Shri Digambar Jain Mandir, Pocket-1, Mayur Vihar Delhi 110 092
 Shri Parshva Nath Digambar Jain Mandir, 50-Parshva Vihar, Patpar Ganj, Delhi 110 092
 Shri Digambar Jain Mandir, Nirman Vihar, Delhi 110 092
 Shri Jaiswal Digambar Jain Mandir, PlotNo-165, Master Block, Shakarpur Delhi 110 092
 ShriNamiNath Digambar Jain Mandir, Kaithwada, Post Silampur, Delhi 110 053
 Shri Chandra Prabh Dig. Jain Mandir, Plot-798, Block-D, Gali No-7,Ashok Nagar Delhi -93
 Shri Aadinath Digamber Jain Mandir, Block-C, Gali No.18, Khajoori Khas Colony,Wazirabad
 Shri Jain Mandir Jyoti Nagar, Loni Road, Shahadara,Delhi-110094
 Shri Digamber Jain Mandir Kabool Nagar, Shahadara,Delhi-110032
 
West Delhi Area
 Shri Digambar Jain Mandir, Main Market, Najafgarh Delhi 110 043
 Shri Digambar Jain Mandir, Block B-1, Janakpuri, N.Delhi 110 058
 Shri Digambar Jain Mandir, P-6,Vijay Vihar, Uttam Nagar, East Najafgarh Rd, N.Delhi- 59
 Shri Digambar Jain Chetalya, Gopi Nath Bazaar, Delhi Cantt., Delhi-10
 Shri Digambar Jain Mandir, F-25, Milap Nagar, Uttam Nagar, Delhi 110 058
 Shri Digambar Jain Mandir, Gali No-3, Saadh Nagar, PalamNagar,  Delhi 110 045
 Shri Digambar Jain Mandir, E/181, Karampura, MotiNagar, near post off. Delhi 110 015
 Shri Digambar Jain Mandir, C-2 Block, in front of Pocket 12, Janakpuri,  Delhi 110 058
 Shri Digambar Jain Mandir, Sadar Bazaar, Delhi Cantt., Delhi-10
 Shri Digambar Jain Mandir, Hari Nagar, GhantaGhar, near Hospital,  Delhi 110 064
 Shri Chandraprabh Digambar Jain Chetalya, C-24, BaliNagar, Najafgarh Road, Delhi-15
 Shri Digambar Jain Mandir, Jhadodan kalan, Najafgarh, Delhi 110 043
 Shri Parshva Nath Digambar Jain Mandir, MehramNagar, Near Palam Airport, N.Delhi-10
 Shri Digambar Jain Mandir, Air force, Palam, Delhi Cantt., Delhi-10
 Shri Digambar Jain Mandir, RZ-46,A/23A, Gali no-2, SagarPur, Pankha Rd, N.Delhi- 46
 Shri Digambar Jain Mandir, M-11, Vikaspuri, N.Delhi 110 063
 Shri Digambar Jain Mandir, Main Road, Nangloi, N.Delhi 110 041
 Shri Digambar Jain Mandir, Near Bus Terminal, Inderpuri N.Delhi 110 012
 Shri Digambar Jain Mandir, P-6, Vijay VIhar, Uttam Nagar N.Delhi 110 058
 Shri Digambar Jain Mandir, 12, School Bhawan, Railway Road, Palam, Delhi 110 045
 Shri Digambar Jain Mandir, B-1/B-2 Block, Paschim Vihar N.Delhi 110 063
 Shri Digambar Jain Mandir, 10/349, Sundar Vihar, Paschim Vihar N.Delhi 110 041
 Shri Digambar Jain Mandir, Ashoka Enclave, Near PeeraGarhi Chowk, N.Delhi 110 041
 Shri Digambar Jain Mandir, E-42, Budh Vihar N.Delhi 110 041
 Shri Shanti nath Digambar Jain Mandir, Palam Village, N.Delhi
 Jai Jai Parshva Nath Digambar Jain Mandir, Niranjan Park, Nangli Dairy, Main Najafgarh Road In front of Ranaji Enclave, New Delhi-110 043
 Shri Atishay Kshetra Digambar Jain Ratantray Jin Mandir, Sector-10, Dwarka, New Delhi-110075

North Delhi Area
 Shri Parshva Nath Digambar Jain Mandir BurafKhana, Subji Mandi, Delhi 110 007
 Shri Digambar Jain Mandir, Shakti Nagar (near Crossing), Delhi 110 007
 Shri Digambar Jain Mandir, D-28, Model town, Delhi 110 009
 Shri Parsvanath Jain Mandir Bhaṭṭāraka, Subji Mandi aryapura (Gali Patherwali), Delhi 110 007
 Shri Digambar Jain Mandir, SBI Colony, GT Karnal Road, Delhi 110 007
 Shri Digambar Jain Chetalya, Roop Nagar,(Near Police Station) Delhi 110 007
 Shri Parshva Nath Digambar, Jain Mandir Gulabi Bagh, Delhi 110 007
 Shri Digambar Jain Mandir, F-Block, Ashok Vihar Phase-1 Delhi 110 052
 Shri Digambar Jain Mandir, 1001, Deva Ram Park, Tri Nagar, Delhi 110 035
 Shri Digambar Jain Mandir, Sarswati Vihar, Outer Ring Road, Delhi 110 034
 Shri Digambar Jain Mandir, Vivekanandpuri, Delhi 110 007
 Shri Digambar Jain Mandir, Satyawati Colony, Delhi 110 052
 Shri Digambar Jain Mandir, Rajasthan Apartments, Madhuban Chowk, Pitampura, Delhi-34
 Shri Digambar Jain Mandir, B-Block, Shalimarbagh, Delhi 110 052
 Shri Parshva Nath Digambar Jain Mandir, Kheda Road, Nangli puna, Delhi 110 036
 Shri Digambar Jain Mandir, C-13, Gali No-5 Majlis Park, Azad Pur, Delhi 110 033
 Shri AdiNath Digambar Jain Mandir, Bharat Nagar, Delhi 110 052
 Shri Digambar Jain Mandir, Block-B,R-4, Ashok Vihar, Phase-II Delhi 110 052
 Shri Digambar Jain Mandir, B-Block, Shashtri Nagar,  Delhi 110 052
 Shri Digambar Jain Mandir, CP Block Pitampura, Delhi 110 034
 Shri Digambar Jain Mandir, Rani Bagh, Delhi 110 034
 Shri Digambar Jain Mandir, Sector-9, Ahimsa Vihar, Delhi 110 085
 Shri Digambar Jain Mandir, F-1, U-Block, Pitampura, Delhi 110 034
 Shri Digambar Jain Mandir, Lawrence Road, Mastana Singh Marg, Delhi 110 034
 Shri Digambar Jain Mandir, Pushpanjali Enclave, Pitampura, Delhi 110 034

South Delhi
 Shri Digambar Jain Mandir, Bhogal, N. Delhi 110 034
 Shri Digambar Jain Mandir, Lodhi Colony, N. Delhi 110 003
 Shri Digambar Jain Mandir, Y-Block, Sarojni Nagar, N. Delhi 110 023
 Shri Digambar Jain Mandir, Swarnbhadrakute, Chetalya, F-3, Green Park, N. Delhi-16
 Shri Digambar Jain Mandir, Chirag Delhi, N. Delhi 110 017
 Shri Digambar Jain Mandir, chetalya Mahroli, N. Delhi 110 030
 Shri Digambar Jain Mandir, Gali-4, Plot no 344, Govind Puri, N. Delhi 110 019
 Shri Digambar Jain Mandir, 18-V, Kund Kund Bharti, Institutional Area, N. Delhi 110 067
 Shri Digambar Jain Mandir, N-10, Green Park (Ext), N. Delhi 110 016
 Shri Digambar Jain Mandir, R.K.Puram, Main Rd, Munirka, N. Delhi 110 067
 Shri Digambar Jain Mandir, New Bhogal, Jungpura, N. Delhi 110 014
 Shri Digambar Jain Mandir, Ahimsa Sthal, Near Qutab Minar, Mahroli, N. Delhi 110 030
 Shri Digambar Jain Mandir, Pocket-J, Sarita Vihar, N. Delhi 110 076
 Shri Digambar Jain Mandir, J-227, Sanik Farms, Khanpur, N. Delhi 110 062
 Shri Digambar Jain temple - Vasant Kunj
 
Outer Delhi
 Shri Digambar Jain Mandir, Gulab Vatika, Loni,- 201 102, Ghaziabad, UP 
 Shri Digambar Jain Mandir, New Vikas Nagar, Loni-201 102, Ghaziabad, UP 
 Shri Digambar Jain Mandir, Indirapuri, Loni-201 102, Ghaziabad, UP 
 Shri Parshva Nath Digambar Jain Mandir, Balram Nagar, Loni-201 102, Ghaziabad, UP 
 Shri Shanti Nath Digambar Jain Mandir, Surya Nagar, Ghaziabad, UP 
 Shri Parshva Nath Digambar Jain Mandir, Kavi Nagar, Ghaziabad, UP 
 Shri Digambar Jain Mandir Ghantaghar, Ghaziabad, UP 
 Shri Digambar Jain Mandir, B-37, B, Sector-27, Noida-201 301, UP

Information's about the temples constructed recently: -
 Shri Digambar Jain temple,  B-7, Bhagwan Mahavir Marg, Vasant Kunj, New Delhi 110 070
 Shri Jain Swetambar Mandir Naughra, Kinari Bizari, Delhi, 110006

See also

 Bhattaraka
 Mula Sangh
 Agrawal Jain

References

External links
Jain Professional Network – First professional networking group for Jains all over world

Lal Mandir
The Mehrauli Dadabari complex
Ahimsa Sthal

Delhi
Religion in Delhi
Jain communities
History of Delhi